Antigua and Barbuda maintains diplomatic relations with the United States, Canada, the United Kingdom, and the People's Republic of China, as well as with many Latin American countries and neighbouring Eastern Caribbean states. It is a member of the United Nations, the Commonwealth of Nations, the Organization of American States, the Organisation of Eastern Caribbean States, the Bolivarian Alliance for the Americas, Petrocaribe and the Eastern Caribbean's Regional Security System (RSS).

As a member of CARICOM, Antigua and Barbuda supported efforts by the United States to implement UN Security Council Resolution 940, designed to facilitate the departure of Haiti's de facto authorities from power. The country agreed to contribute personnel to the multinational force which restored the democratically elected government of Haiti in October 1994.

In May 1997, Prime Minister Bird joined 14 other Caribbean leaders and President Clinton for the first-ever US-regional summit in Bridgetown, Barbados. The summit strengthened the basis for regional co-operation on justice and counter-narcotics issues, finance and development, and trade.

Antigua and Barbuda is also a member of the International Criminal Court with a Bilateral Immunity Agreement of protection for the US-military (as covered under Article 98).

Disputes – international:
none

Illicit drugs:
considered a minor transshipment point for narcotics bound for the US and Europe; more significant as a drug-money-laundering center.

Diplomatic relations

Bilateral relations

See also
West Indies Associated States
Organisation of Eastern Caribbean States
List of diplomatic missions in Antigua and Barbuda
List of diplomatic missions of Antigua and Barbuda
North American Union
North American Free Trade Agreement
Free Trade Area of the Americas
Third Border Initiative
Caribbean Community
Caribbean Basin Initiative (CBI)
Caribbean Basin Trade Partnership Act
Western Hemisphere Travel Initiative

References

External links
 History of Antigua and Barbuda – U.S. relations

 
Government of Antigua and Barbuda